C49 or C-49 may refer to:

 C49 road (Namibia)
 Caldwell 49, an H II region
 Douglas C-49, an American military transport aircraft
 Four Knights Game, a chess opening